TMEM267 is a protein that in humans is encoded by the TMEM267 gene. It is a possible oncogene which encodes a transmembrane protein. The function of TMEM267 most likely involves transportation of molecules from the cytosol, as the presence of motifs and domains involved in transportation were conserved in orthologs. TMEM267 has orthologs in many species and is expressed at highest levels in the thyroid.

Gene 

Known aliases for TMEM267include C5orf28, B2RDA6, and Q9H6Z2. TMEM267 is found on chromosome 5, cytoband p12 on the reverse strand between base pairs 43,444,252 and 43,485,178, meaning it has length of 40,927 base pairs. TMEM267 produces 13 distinct gt-ag introns and 12 different mRNAs, with 9 alternatively spliced variants and 3 unspliced forms. It has 2 alternative promoters and 7 validated polyadenylation sites. There are 6 predicted promoters of varying lengths.

Protein

General information 
The TMEM267 protein in all isoforms is 215 amino acids in length. All of the isoforms have a predicted molecular mass of 24.2 kDa and theoretical isoelectric point of 8.91. There was an above average percentage of histidine and tryptophan residues. The percentage of asparagine, glutamic acid and tyrosine were below average. After analysis of Antarctic Yellowbelly Rockcod, Tropical clawed frog, Willow flycatcher,  Common wall lizard, and pacific white-sided dolphin orthologs, above average percent composition of tryptophan and below average percent composition of asparagine and glutamic acid residues was conserved across amphibians, fish, mammals, birds, and reptiles.

Isoforms

Transmembrane regions 
The predictions surrounding the transmembrane regions of TMEM267 are unclear. Some prediction tools claim there are no transmembrane or hydrophobic regions. Others predict between 2 and 5 transmembrane domains. 
 The consensus is that there is most likely at least two transmembrane regions in the amino acids in the region around 113-135 and 176–198. The helical wheel diagrams of the three transmembrane regions given by NCBI Gene indicate the presence of polar amino acid which are basic and acidic in the transmembrane regions which is unusual.

Domains
Two domains were predicted for TMEM267. First is a LaxA-binding, inner membrane-associated mutative hydrolase, which indicates that TMEM267 may be involved as a group of membrane-bound metal-dependent hydrolases that may act as phospholipases. The other is predicted to be a Vacuolar sorting protein 9 (VPS9) domain, which indicates that TMEM267 may be involved in trafficking of molecules to lysosomes and cell signaling.

Motifs
Motifs that were predicted are a canonical arginine-containing phosphopeptide motif, which may be involved in the transportation of the 14-3-3 proteins which are involved in many cellular processes. A binding site for Interferon Regulatory Factor 3 (IRF-3) protein may be involved in the signaling pathway which actives IRF-3 in the presence of viral and microbial infections. Tryptophan-based motifs which enable targeting of tethering to a homology domain could mean that TMEM267 may play a role in mediating transportation form the Golgi to the ER. The coatomer subunit delta (delta-COP) is a cytosolic protein complex that binds to motifs and associates with vesicles involved in protein transport from the ER and Golgi. An LC3-Interacting Region (LIR) motif was predicted, which indicates that TMEM267 may be involved in the autophagy pathway, which is involved in transferring of cytoplasmic material in autophagosomes to lysosomes as well as removal of toxic macromolecules and organelles to maintain the health of the cell. The Class 2 PDZ-binding motif predicts that TMEM267 could be involved with PDZ proteins, which are influential in trafficking, recycling, and intracellular sorting. The Wxxx[FY] motif indicates that TMEM267 could be involved in the interaction of Pex14 with Pex5 proteins.

Localization and abundance 

Overall, TMEM267 is most likely found in the cytoplasm. The TMEM267 protein was claimed to be localized in the nucleoplasm of cells. Another tool predicted it to be found in the cytoplasm (69.6%) and mitochondrial (13%) with reliability 94.1 from Reinhardt's method for Cytoplasmic/Nuclear discrimination.  TMEM267 is not abundant in the human body at 0.05 ppm.

Secondary structure predictions 
Secondary structure predictions were done using the transmembrane regions for TMEM267 given by NCBI Gene. The prediction servers indicate that amino acids 1-76 are helical in nature. The extracellular and intracellular regions of the TMEM267 protein are predicted to be a combination of alpha helices and beta sheets, but there is not a consensus.

Post-translational modifications 

There is no evidence of post-translational modifications of the TMEM267 protein found in tissues. According to protein sequence analysis, there is a prediction of one palmitoylation site, a SUMO Interaction and two sumoylation sites. There are many predicted phosphorylation sites in the non-transmembrane regions with various protein kinases including AGC, CKII, and Case kinase II. One site is predicted to be acetylated in the N-terminus of TMEM267. TMEM267 has four predicted glycation sites, as well as seven O-beta-GlycNAc sites.

Expression 

TMEM267 protein is expressed in over 100 tissues in the body, meaning it has low tissue specificity, but is largely present in the thyroid, pituitary gland, and pancreas. Data from NCBI Geo shows that there are higher levels of expression in mainly the thyroid but other tissues have varied expression for each sample. There seems to be, on average, highest expression levels in thyroid, ovaries, testes, pituitary gland, and pancreas. TMEM267 is not expressed at a very high level compared to Beta Actin, which has almost triple the RPKM compared to TMEM267. TMEM267 is expressed at 1.6 times the average gene on chromosome 5.

Interactions

Transcription factors 
The table below describes a curated set of transcription factors which are predicted to bind in the Genomatix predicted TMEM267 promoter region.

Interacting proteins 
TMEM267 was predicted to interact with the proteins in the table below.

Homology and evolution

Orthologs and paralogs 
TMEM267 has orthologs in Mammalia, Reptilia, Amphibia, Mollusca, Arthropoda, Branchiostoma, Trichoplax, Oomycetes, and Bacteria, among others, but has no paralogs. A table of select orthologs is listed below.

Evolution 
TMEM267 is predicted to evolve slower than  Fibrinogen Alpha Chain but faster than Cytochrome C.

Function

Clinical significance 
The protein was identified as a member of a large group of proteins that comprise a filter in mammalian cells which allow selective passage of proteins in and out of the cilium, regulating the contents. TMEM267 was one of ten genes selected using the two-sample t-test and Wilcoxon Mann-Whitney analysis of training data on atopic dermatitis (a skin disease characterized by areas of severe itching, redness, scaling, and loss of the surface of the skin), as a gene that provided the most information about the separation between the control and experimental groups. TMEM267 is mentioned in articles pertaining to the down-regulation of two miRNAs, one of which is involved in regulating a wide variety of cellular functions, such as proliferation, apoptosis, migration, and differentiation, all of which are vital for the normal development of heart cells.

Cancer 
TMEM267 protein was shown to be mutated in 0.1-0.9% of colorectal, stomach, lung, endometrial, kidney, and breast cancer. TMEM267 was affected by increased levels of the NUDT21 gene, and was identified as a part of a large group of possible oncogenes, that when the 3'-UTR is shortened, can cause uncontrollable cell growth. It is a part of a group of genes which can possibly identify survival rates of patients with PNI+ tongue cancer. TMEM267 was shown to be one of 26 over-expressed genes on chromosome 5p, meaning it belongs to a group of genes which likely provides cancer cells with advantages in growth and invasion of surrounding cells. In addition, researchers from The Johns Hopkins University filed a patent for 63 genes, including TMEM267 which had increased expression in the presence of HMGA1 protein compared to the control group, which they think could be of use in a method of inhibiting cancer stem cells with HMGA1 inhibitors.

References 

Genes on human chromosome 5